Sainik School Bijapur is one of the 25 Sainik Schools of India. The Bijapur Sainik School was established by the government of India in 1963. The school prepares boys to join the armed forces. The school has contributed about 600 officers.

Sainik School Bijapur is located in the district Bijapur, Karnataka, India. The campus spreads across   of land. Every year nearly 100 students join the school in the sixth class, after clearing the selection procedure, which includes a written test, interview and a medical examination.

The efforts of former interim chief minister of undivided Bijapur district, late S R Kanthi led to the school being established. His efforts led to the administrators giving the go-ahead to set up the school in the district.

It began its work at Vijay College campus. After construction of the new building was completed in 1966, it was shifted to the present premises. During the last four decades, the school has contributed nearly 400 officers to the armed forces, three of whom have reached the rank of Lt General or an equivalent.

The school has three service officers, 32 teaching, 17 administration staff and 45 general employees on its roll. Six hostels, named after the famous dynasties that ruled the state, have been provided for the students. It has recorded the best results in class XII amongst all Sainik schools.

Main Building
The main building houses the administrative office and the offices of the Principal, the Headmaster and the Registrar of the school. It also has classrooms for classes VI to XII and laboratories (Physics, Chemistry, Biology, Languages, IT and Internet), an audio-visual room, a library, academic blocks, dining halls, conference rooms, multimedia training room and a reading room.

Hostel Blocks
There are 6 hostels which accommodate the 650 students studying in the school. The hostels have rooms for study, recreation, TV, and table tennis, besides a barber room. Each house has House Masters and Superintendents. The houses are named Wodeyar, Hoysala, Chalukya, Adilshahi, Vijaynagar and Rashtrakuta - named after the dynasties that ruled the state of Karnataka.

Cadets' mess
The campus has a Central Mess which caters to all the students in one sitting.

Sports and games
In sports events the cadets have secured trophies at the national level.

There is physical training at 5:30 am, under the guidance of Army instructors. Students can play the games of their choice in the evening at 4:30 pm, choosing from football, basketball, hockey, volleyball, Squash. There is a gym facility, swimming pool, horse stable and snooker table.

See also
 Indian Naval Academy

External links
School Official Website
school blog

Boys' schools in India
Sainik schools
Boarding schools in Karnataka
Bijapur, Karnataka
Schools in Bijapur district
Educational institutions established in 1963
1963 establishments in Mysore State